Asenath (Koine Greek: Ἀσενέθ, Asenéth) is a minor figure in the Book of Genesis. Asenath was a high-born, aristocratic Egyptian woman. She was the wife of Joseph and the mother of his sons, Manasseh and Ephraim. There are two Rabbinic approaches to Asenath: One holds that she was an ethnic Egyptian woman that converted to marry Joseph. This view has her accepting the Lord before marriage and then raising her two sons in the tenets of Judaism. This presents her as a positive example of conversion, and places her among the devout women converts. The other approach argues she was not Egyptian by descent, but was from the family of Jacob. Traditions that trace her to the family of Jacob relate that she was born as the daughter of Dinah. Dinah was raped by Shechem and gave birth to Asenath, whom Jacob left on the wall of Egypt, where she was later found by Potiphar. She was then raised by Potiphar's wife and eventually married Joseph.

Asenath's importance is related to the birth of her two sons, who later become forefathers of two of the twelve tribes of Israel.

Name

Her name is believed to derive from the Ancient Egyptian js.w-(n)-n(j)t, meaning "belonging/she belongs to Neith". Neith was an Egyptian goddess.

"Asenath" or "Osnat" is a commonly used female first name in present-day Israel.

Portrayal 
First mentioned in Genesis 41:45, Asenath is said to be the wife of Joseph and the mother of his sons, Manasseh and Ephraim. In the Book of Genesis, she is referred to as the daughter of Potipherah priest of On (Gk. Heliopolis). In the Book of Jubilees, she is said to be given to Joseph to marry by the Pharaoh, a daughter of Potiphar, a high priest of Heliopolis, with no clarification as to whether or not this Potiphar is the same Potiphar whose wife falsely accused Joseph of attempting to rape her. While in the Midrash and Targum Pseudo-Jonathan, she is said to be the daughter of Dinah, Joseph's sister, and Shechem, born of an illicit union, described as either premarital sex or rape, depending on the narrative. A later-date apocryphal publication, written in Greek, believed to be a Christian document, called Joseph and Aseneth, supposedly details their relationship and their 48-year long reign over Egypt; in it, Asenath weds Joseph, whose brothers Dan and Gad plot to kill him for the sake of Pharaoh's son, who wants Asenath to be his wife, only for their efforts to be thwarted by Joseph's younger brother Benjamin.

Depictions

Joseph and Asenath 
Joseph and Asenath's relationship is mentioned in three verses in the bible. Their relationship is first mentioned in Genesis 41:45. The Pharaoh is said to have given Joseph, Asenath daughter of Potiphera, priest of On, as his wife. It is later mentioned in Genesis 41:50 that before the years of famine, Joseph had two sons with Asenath. Those two sons were named Manasseh, who was the first born and the other son was named Ephraim, who was the second born. Later in Genesis 46:20 Joseph and Asenath are mentioned in the family of Jacob which mentions that in Egypt, Joseph had two sons named Manasseh and Ephraim, whom Asenath, daughter of Potiphera, the priest of On, bore to Joseph.

Veneration 
Asenath is venerated in Catholic Church as a saint. Her feast day is 13 December.

References

External links
Text of Joseph and Asenath 

Ancient Egyptian women
Biblical matriarchs
Converts to Judaism from paganism
Joseph (Genesis)
Book of Genesis people
Book of Jubilees
Women in the Hebrew Bible
Christian saints in unknown century
Roman Catholic royal saints
Christian royal saints
Saints
Christian saints from the Old Testament
Old Testament people